The Cobbler of Ordis ("el sabater d'Ordis" in the Catalan language) is a literary character created by the Catalan poet Carles Fages de Climent, who in 1954 published  The ballad of the Cobbler of Ordis, a book of poems with a prologue by the Catalan writer and philosopher Eugeni d'Ors, and illustrated – including an epilogue – by Salvador Dalí, a former classmate and close friend of the author. The character, who Eugeni d'Ors compared with Don Quixote, used to walk through the dusty paths and alleys of the Catalan county of Ampurdan, while directing the tramuntana, the north wind, with a cane.

External links
Dalí and Fages: "that intelligent and most cordial of collaborations" Carme Ruiz, Centre for Dalinian Studies, 6 July 2002
"The shameful life of Salvador Dalí" (the witches of Llers)".

Fiction about shoemakers
Characters in poems
Catalan-language literature
Fictional Spanish people